The 2022 Supersport 300 World Championship was the sixth season of the Supersport 300 World Championship. It started on April 8 at the MotorLand Aragón, and ended on October 9 at the Algarve International Circuit.

The championship was marred by the death of championship runner-up Victor Steeman, who suffered fatal injuries in an accident at the penultimate race of the season at the Algarve International Circuit.

Race calendar and results

Entry list

Championship standings
Points

Riders' championship

Manufacturers' championship

References

External links
 

Supersport 300 World Championship seasons
Supersport 300 World Championship
Motorcycle racing controversies